Fred Werner born Gottfried W Werner was an Australian composer, music teacher. He was possibly born near Berlin 
where he attended the prestigious Stern Conservatory and studied under Polish composer Theodor Kullak.
He migrated to Coolabah near Dubbo in New South Wales, Australia around 1890.
In 1902 he married Emma Durrell and had a son Charles.
In 1910 he was appointed to the Staff of Sydney Conservatorium of Music where he taught keyboard and held several recitals.

In 1915 he left teaching, possibly due to wartime Australian racism, and in 1916 he became licensee at the Coolabah Hotel 

His best known student was Kate Rooney who succeeded in tours of London and USA

Works
 Six pieces for piano [for student instruction]
 Stray leaves (including 'Bacarolle' and 'minuet' intended for ballet students)
 Octave studies for convent schools
 Romance 
 Desiderata
 Ǽnone Waltz 
 Berceuse
 Aubade
 Three songs

References

19th-century classical composers
19th-century conductors (music)
19th-century Australian musicians
20th-century classical composers
20th-century conductors (music)
20th-century Australian musicians
20th-century Australian male musicians
Australian classical composers
Australian male classical composers
Australian male composers
German classical composers
Academic staff of the Sydney Conservatorium of Music